Statistics of the V-League in the 1997 season.

Standings
Table in June 1997:

Champions: Cang Sai Gon

References
1997 V-League at RSSSF

Vietnamese Super League seasons
Viet
Viet
1